"Dance This Mess Around" is a song by American new wave band The B-52's. It was released in 1979, as the third and final single from their self-titled debut album. The song features Cindy Wilson on lead vocals, as well as Fred Schneider and Kate Pierson, and has become a live favorite, even 40 years after its release. It was heard once in Alex Strangelove.

Critical reception 
Stephen Thomas Erlewine of AllMusic stated in his review of the band's debut album that, along with "Planet Claire" and "Rock Lobster", "It's all great fun, but [the album] wouldn't have resonated throughout the years if the group hadn't written such incredibly infectious, memorable tunes as... 'Dance This Mess Around'" In his review of the track, Evan Sawdey of PopMatters mentions that "fans have known this track for years as not only one of the finest tunes the group has ever composed, but also one of the absolute best tracks of the era," and that "This, along with "52 Girls", are the kind of songs that gave the band's debut its distinct personality."

Personnel 
 Cindy Wilson - vocals, tambourine
 Fred Schneider - vocals, toy piano
 Kate Pierson - synth bass, organ, vocals
 Ricky Wilson - guitar
 Keith Strickland - drums, percussion

Chart positions

References 



The B-52's songs
Songs about dancing
Songs written by Cindy Wilson
Songs written by Fred Schneider
1979 singles
Warner Records singles
1979 songs
Song recordings produced by Chris Blackwell